The Collapse of Chaos: Discovering Simplicity in a Complex World (1994) is a book about complexity theory and the nature of scientific explanation written by biologist Jack Cohen and mathematician Ian Stewart.

In this book Cohen and Stewart give their ideas on chaos theory, particularly on how the simple leads to the complex, and conversely, how the complex leads to the simple, and argue for a need for contextual explanation in science as a complement to reduction.  This book dovetails with other books written by the Cohen-Stewart team, particularly Figments of Reality.

As with other Cohen-Stewart books, topics are illustrated with humorous science fiction snippets dealing with a fictional alien intelligence, the Zarathustrians, whom Cohen and Stewart use as metaphors of the human mind itself.

Reception
Next Generation commented, "Although the book assumes you have zero knowledge of science (and thus is a little patronizing in the early chapters), it presents the concepts of Complexity Theory as well as anything we've seen."

Additional reviews

References

 Jack Cohen and Ian Stewart: The Collapse of Chaos: discovering simplicity in a complex world, Penguin Books, 1994, 

Books by Ian Stewart (mathematician)
Science books
1994 non-fiction books
Chaos theory